Kühgundkopf is a 1907-meter mountain in the Allgäu Alps of Bavaria, Germany near Reutte, Tyrol, Austria. The Kühgundspitze  is a rock head with cross in the Northeast part of the mountain of the Tannheimer Tal pull off.

References 

Mountains of Bavaria
Allgäu Alps
Mountains of the Alps